Chondroitin ABC lyase (chondroitinase, chondroitin ABC eliminase, chondroitinase ABC) is an enzyme with systematic name chondroitin ABC lyase. This enzyme catalyses the following chemical reaction

 Eliminative degradation of polysaccharides containing 1,4-beta-D-hexosaminyl and 1,3-beta-D-glucuronosyl or 1,3-alpha-L-iduronosyl linkages to disaccharides containing 4-deoxy-beta-D-gluc-4-enuronosyl groups

This enzyme acts on chondroitin 4-sulfate, chondroitin 6-sulfate and dermatan sulfate.

Uses 

Following a spinal cord injury, this enzyme can be used to erode scar tissue that can interfere with regeneration.

References

External links 
 

EC 4.2.2
Regenerative biomedicine